Paul Kane (1810–1871) was an Irish-Canadian painter.

Paul Kane may also refer to:

Paul Kane (writer) (born 1973), British science fiction writer
Paul Kane (footballer) (born 1965), Scottish footballer
Paul Kane (entrepreneur), British technology company executive
Paul Kane (poet) (born 1950), American poet, critic and scholar
Paul Kane, a former stage name of Paul Simon (born 1941)

See also
Paul Kane High School, a school in St. Albert, Alberta
Paul Cain (disambiguation)